La Cañada High School is a combined junior-senior high school located in La Cañada Flintridge, California, US. It sits at the base of the San Gabriel Mountains, below the Angeles National Forest, in the City of La Cañada Flintridge. The school is adjacent to the Interstate 210 Freeway north of Pasadena's Rose Bowl and south of NASA's Jet Propulsion Laboratory.

History
La Cañada High School has been named both a California Distinguished School and a National Blue Ribbon School. The U.S. Department of Education has recognized LCHS for “high achievement and exemplary programs”, for rich extracurricular activities, and for strong community support.  With an enrollment of 1,389 pupils in grades 9 through 12, La Cañada High has also consistently received the maximum six years of accreditation by the Western Association of Schools and Colleges.

Academic awards
La Cañada High School was named a California Distinguished School by the California Department of Education in 1986 and again in 2003 and 2021.

La Cañada High School has been recognized by the United States Department of Education three times as a National Blue Ribbon School, first in 1992 and 1993, again in 2004, and most recently in 2015.

In 2009, La Cañada High School was ranked 80th out of all public schools in the U.S and 23rd in the state of California by the U.S. News & World Report.

In 2009, La Cañada High achieved a new school record of 20 students admitted as National Merit Scholarship semifinalists.

Notable alumni

 Michael Cunningham (Class of 1970), author of the 1998 Pulitzer Prize-winning novel The Hours
 Doug Davidson (Class of 1973), actor (The Young and the Restless).
 Taylor Negron (Class of 1975) actor, comedian, painter, and playwright
 Chris Holmes (Class of 1976), lead guitarist W.A.S.P.
 Phil Joanou (Class of 1979), film director (Rattle and Hum, Three O'Clock High)
 Mark Riebling (Class of 1982), author of Wedge: The Secret War Between the FBI and the CIA
 Sam Farmer (Class of 1984) sportswriter, Los Angeles Times NFL writer
 Tommy Kendall (Class of 1985), Race car driver
 Matt Whisenant (Class of 1988), former Major League Baseball pitcher
 Brian Behlendorf (Class of 1991), computer programmer, developer of the Apache Web server
 Chris D'Elia (Class of 1998), stand-up comic and actor
 Indra Petersons (Class of 1998), a weather anchor for CNN's New Day and CNN Newsroom programs
 Erin Coscarelli (Class of 2002), Host NFL Network Gameday Pick'em
 David Lipsky (Class of 2006), golfer
 Trace Cyrus, (Class of 2007) (dropped out in 2006) member of the band Metro Station, adopted son of Billy Ray Cyrus
 Brianne Howey, (Class of 2007) (moved in 8th grade), actor
 Olivia Smith (journalist), (Class of 2007), Emmy award-winning journalist
 Kate Hansen (Class of 2010), 2014 Winter Olympic luger
Collin Morikawa (Class of 2015), golfer

References

External links
La Cañada High School - Official Site — provided by the La Cañada Unified School District
La Cañada High School Alumni Association

High schools in Los Angeles County, California
La Cañada Flintridge, California
Public high schools in California
1963 establishments in California
Educational institutions established in 1963